Villa Maria Academy was a private, Roman Catholic high school in Erie, Pennsylvania.  It was in the Roman Catholic Diocese of Erie. In 2019, 83 students graduated from Villa Maria Academy and 100% of the graduating class was accepted into a four-year college. The school also has 12:1 student to teacher ratio.

References

External links
 School website

Catholic secondary schools in Pennsylvania
Education in Erie, Pennsylvania
Educational institutions established in 1892
Schools in Erie County, Pennsylvania
1892 establishments in Pennsylvania